Country Fair is a 1941 American comedy film directed by Frank McDonald and written by Dorrell McGowan and Stuart E. McGowan. The film stars Eddie Foy, Jr., June Clyde, Guinn "Big Boy" Williams, William Demarest, Harold Huber and Ferris Taylor. The film was released on May 5, 1941, by Republic Pictures.

Plot

Cast 
Eddie Foy, Jr. as Johnny Campbell
June Clyde as Pepper Wilson
Guinn "Big Boy" Williams as Gunther Potts
William Demarest as Stogie McPhee
Harold Huber as Cash Nichols
Ferris Taylor as Cornelius Simpson
Maurice Cass as Sneezy
Myrtle Wiseman as Lulu Belle
Scotty Wiseman as Scotty
Harold Peary as Gildersleeve
The Duke of Paducah as Whitey

References

External links 
 

1941 films
1940s English-language films
American comedy films
1941 comedy films
Republic Pictures films
Films directed by Frank McDonald
American black-and-white films
1940s American films